The Garden or The Gardens may refer to:

Places
Madison Square Garden, the arena of the New York Knicks basketball and New York Rangers ice hockey teams
The Garden, a school of philosophy founded by Epicurus c. 306 BCE
TD Garden, the arena of the Boston Celtics basketball and Boston Bruins ice hockey teams
Boston Garden, the former (and more famous) home of the Celtics and Bruins
Covent Garden, a district of central London
Hatton Garden, the diamond district of London
The Royal Opera House, Covent Garden, London
Garden at Buckingham Palace, often referred to as The Garden
The Gardens, Dubai, a community in Dubai, United Arab Emirates
The Gardens, Gauteng, a suburb in Johannesburg, South Africa
The Gardens, a zone in the locality of St. Julian's, Malta
The Gardens, Otago, a suburb of Dunedin, New Zealand
The Gardens, Auckland, a suburb of Manukau City, New Zealand
The Gardens, Northern Territory, a suburb of Darwin, Australia
The Gardens, Tasmania, a locality in Australia
The Garden (pastoral station), a pastoral station near Alice Springs, Australia
Cincinnati Gardens, the arena in Cincinnati, Ohio
Discovery Gardens, a community in Dubai, United Arab Emirates
Maple Leaf Gardens, the arena of the former home of the Toronto Maple Leafs ice hockey team

Publications
"The Garden" (poem), a poem by Andrew Marvell
The Garden, a magazine started in 1871 by William Robinson
The Garden (journal), the journal of the British Royal Horticultural Society
"The Garden" (short story), a 1964 short story by Paul Bowles
The Garden: Visions of Paradise, a 1994 illustrated book by Gabrielle van Zuylen

Films
The Garden (1977 film), an Israeli film by Victor Nord
The Garden (1990 film), a British film by Derek Jarman
The Garden (1995 film), a Slovak film by Martin Šulík
The Garden (2006 film), an American drama-horror film
The Garden (2008 film), a documentary by Scott Hamilton Kennedy
The Garden (2017 film), a German drama film
The Garden (2020 film), an Icelandic film by Ragnar Bragason

Music
The Garden (band), an experimental rock/post-punk duo from Orange County, California

Albums
The Garden (Bran Van 3000 album), 2010
The Garden (John Foxx album), 1981
The Garden (Merril Bainbridge album), 1995
The Garden (Kari Jobe album), 2017
The Garden (Michael Nesmith album), 1994
The Garden (Silver Apples album), 1998
The Garden (Zero 7 album), 2006
The Garden, an allegorical oratorio by Michael McLean, 1995
The Garden, 2008 album by Unitopia
The Garden, 2022 album by Basia Bulat

Songs
"The Garden" (Australia Too song) 1985
"The Garden" (Guns N' Roses song), 1992
"The Garden" (Take That song), 2009
"The Garden", a song by Rush from the 2012 album Clockwork Angels
"The Garden", a song by Einstürzende Neubauten from the 1996 album Ende Neu

Other uses
The Garden, surrounding The House in The Claidi Journals
The Garden, a restaurant on the top floor of the Joseph Smith Memorial Building in downtown Salt Lake City
"The Garden" (Chowder episode), a 2009 episode of Chowder

See also
Garden (disambiguation)
In the Garden (disambiguation)